Jenna McCarthy is an American author and speaker. She has written comedic books for children and adults. Her TEDx Talk "What You Don't Know About Marriage" got over 4 million views on TED.

Publications 

 Pretty Much Screwed
 I've Still Got It... I Just Can't Remember Where I Put It: Awkwardly True Tales from the Far Side of Forty
 If It Was Easy They'd Call the Whole Damn Thing a Honeymoon: Living With and Loving the TV-Addicted, Sex-Obsessed, Not-So-Handy Man You Married
 The Parent Trip: From High Heels and Parties to Highchairs and Potties
 Cheers to the New Mom
 Cheers to the New Dad
 Big Rigs for Moms
 Tea Parties for Dads.

References

External links 
 
 Jenna McCarthy at Goodreads
 Jenna McCarthy at British National Bibliography
 Jenna McCarthy speaker profile at TED

Living people
Place of birth missing (living people)
Year of birth missing (living people)
Writers from New York (state)
Florida State University alumni